Retribution is a video game developed by British studio Astros Productions and published by Gremlin Interactive for DOS.

Gameplay
Retribution is a game in which the player participates in missions on the land and in the air using various vehicles.

Reception
Next Generation reviewed the game, rating it two stars out of five, and stated that "Mediocre graphics and a generally weak set of sound effects don't do much to generate excitement for what, in the end, is a yawner of a game."

Reviews
PC Gamer (April 1995)
Computer Gaming World (Apr, 1995)
PC Games - Feb, 1995
Pelit - Jan, 1995
MikroBitti - Jan, 1995

References

External links
 

1994 video games
DOS games
DOS-only games
First-person shooters
Vehicle simulation games
Video games developed in the United Kingdom